Harfo ( or ) is a town in the north-central Mudug region of Somalia.
Harfo used to be known, and is still popularly known as Harfo agabar

History
The village of Harfo/Harfa  was founded in 1900. The village served as a military garrison of the Sultanate of Obbia under Sultan Ali Yussuf.  The village expanded, was nominated for township in the 1980s, and became a member district and township of Mudug region in 1990s. Harfa has witnessed further growth and development since the establishment of Puntland in 1998, mostly fueled by investment by the Somali diaspora in Europe and the Americas.

Today, the town of Harfo/Harfa is a mid-sized town with a population over 20,000. The town has recently become the headquarters of Puntland's customs authority. Today Harfo/Harfa is the 9th largest town in Puntland.

Administration 
Harfo is situated in the north-central part of Somalia, and is one of the most developed towns in the region. The city is divided into four main administrative districts called Jabuuti, Ubax, Hilaac and Wadajir.

Education 
Harfo has number of academic institutions. According to the Puntland ministry of education Harfo has thee primary schools and one secondary school. Primary schools are Horyaal primary school and Harfo peace and development school which are locates in Jabuuti village and Furqaan primary school which locates near Boorey market. Suldan Hurre secondary school is the only secondary school in Harfo which is named after Suldan Mohamuud Hurre who was Somali elder.

Notable personalities of Harfa/Harfo origin 

 A. Bulhan - Scholar, Leader and Sultanate State Affairs Minister for the service of  His Majesty Sultan Ali Yuusuf (Sultanate of Obbia)
 Du'ale Farah - Lieutenant commander of Sultanate Forces of Obbia of His Majesty Sultan Ali (Sultanate of Obbia)
 Abdisalam Issa-Salwe - Scholar,  Professor at Taibah University, and Thames Valley University, UK
 Abdullahi Ahmed Irro  - Scholar, Graduate of the USSR Frunze Acedemy, Professor of Strategy and a General in Somali Army 1970s-1980s
 Hawa Aden Amey -  Educator and social activist. Executive Director of the Galkayo Education Center for Peace and Development.
 Yaasin Nur Godane - Banker, Member of the Somali Administration 1941 -1959 and Governor of Hiran Region
 Ali Karaani - A senior leader of Somali Police Force, and the former head of Police Institute of Somalia known as Scuola di polizia 
 Abdullahi Farah Holif - A Graduate of Princeton University, USA. and former head of the Financial Guards of Somalia known as Guardia di Finanza
 Mohamed Isse Salwe - Director General of Somalia's Tourism Industry
 Abdirisaq Yussuf Elmi - Scholar, Graduate of USSR Leningrad  Engineering & Railway University,  Engineer and former minister in Autonomous  Puntland State.

References
Harfo, Mudug, Somalia

Populated places in Mudug